Fatima Beyina-Moussa is the Chief Executive Officer (CEO) of ECAir, the national airline of the Republic of Congo. She was CEO when the airline began in March 2011 and became President of the Association of Airlines of Africa in November 2014.

After having graduated undergrad from HEC Montréal and receiving her MBA from the University of Ottawa), Fatima-Beyina Moussa worked as a consultant for Ernst & Young in the Congo. She then joined the Bank of Central African States (BEAC), before working with the United Nations Development Programme. After, she was appointed as an Advisor to the Ministry of Finance, Budget and Public Portfolio, where she was responsible in particular for establishing a national airline.

Four years after its launch, ECAir, which has a fleet of seven aircraft (four Boeing 737s, two Boeing 757, one Boeing 767) serves domestically Pointe-Noire and Ollombo, several African cities (Douala, Cotonou, Libreville, Dakar, Bamako) and Paris, Dubai (UAE) and Beirut. Shortly, ECAir will open new lines Abidjan, Yaounde, Ndjamena, Bangui). ECAir has transported over a million of passengers since its creation.

Fatima Beyina-Moussa, a member of the Executive Committee of AFRAA since November 2012, was appointed president of the association in November 2014.

References 

 Fatima Moussa Beyina-appointed President of the Association of African Airlines (press release)

Further reading 
 ECAir

External links 
 Fatima Beyina-Moussa collected news and commentary at Jeune Afrique August 26, 2013
 Fatima Beyina-Moussa: President of AFRAA confides ...at AFRICA TOP SUCCESS May 30, 2015
 Air - Congo: the ambitious Equatorial Congo Airlines spreads its wings on afrique.lepoint.fr
 Air: Fatima Beyina-Moussa wins the presidency of the Afraa on jeuneafrique.com the November 14, 2014
 Fatima Beyina-Moussa is also President of the Board of Directors of the AISB (American International School of Brazzaville) Friday, November 9, 2012 on lasemaineafricaine.net
 Fatima Beyina-Moussa on the cover of magazine agenceecofin.com Brown (2015)
 Woman and CEO of an African airline: meeting with Fatima Beyina-Moussa on fashizblack.com of March 31, 2014
 FATIMA BEYINA MOUSSA, the heart Equatorial Congo Airlines - Equatorial Congo Airlines the first female CEO of a company Air in Francophone Africa. Brune on Magazine No. 63 of May 21, 2015
 Beyina Fatima Moussa received in audience by the President of the Commission of the African Union. to see on ActuECAir dated August 19, 2015
 Interview with Fatima Moussa Beyina in Africa Mediterranean Business to see on ECO FINANCE AGENCY of August 28, 2015
 Equatorial Congo Airlines signs partnership agreement with the WHO to see on ECO FINANCE AGENCY
 Equatorial Congo Airlines reward the best athletes in the African Games! to read on https://web.archive.org/web/20160110225708/http://www.ecairactu.com/
 Fatima Beyina-Moussa: "Circulate at will within Africa - that the fight AFRAA!" About Fatima Moussa Beyina-reading on http://www.anacgabon.org/, http://adac-tchad.org/ and http://www.africa-live.de/

Republic of the Congo women
Living people
Year of birth missing (living people)
Republic of the Congo businesspeople